Bhodesar Mosque is located in Tharparkar District, Sindh, Pakistan. The white marble mosque of Bhodesar is built in a style that was highly influenced by the architecture of nearby Jain temples. The mosque was built in 1505 CE by the Sultan Mahmud Begada of Gujarat. The mosque features a central dome very similar to domes found on the nearby Jain temples,  resting upon a square shaped edifice measuring 9.2 metres on each side. Pillars at the mosque also reflect Jain architecture, while decorative elements along the roofline were also inspired by Jain temples.

References

Tharparkar District
Mosques in Sindh
15th-century mosques